Alan Jones may refer to:

Sport 
Alan Jones (bobsleigh) (born 1946), British Olympic bobsledder
Alan Jones (Australian cricketer) (born 1948), Australian cricketer
Alan Jones (Scottish cricketer) (1927–2009), Scottish cricketer
Alan Jones (cricketer, born 1938), Welsh cricketer
Alan Jones (cricketer, born 1957), former Welsh cricketer
Alan Jones (footballer, born 1939), Welsh football goalkeeper
Alan Jones (footballer, born 1944), Welsh football winger
Alan Jones (footballer, born 1945), Welsh footballer
Alan Jones (footballer, born 1951), English footballer
Alan Jones (racing driver) (born 1946), Australian racing driver and Formula One World Champion 1980
Allan Jones (footballer, born 1940) (1940–1993), Welsh footballer who played as a full back

Entertainers 
Alan Jones (radio broadcaster) (born 1941), Australian radio broadcaster and former rugby coach
Alan Jones (cinematographer), cinematographer active 1984–1996; see Love Is All There Is
Alan Jones (drummer) (born 1962), American jazz drummer
Alan Jones (bassist) (born 1947), English bass guitar player with groups such as The Shadows
Alan Rankin Jones (died 1945), American jazz pianist, composer, and lyricist

Science 
Alan A. Jones (1944–2006), American chemistry professor
Alan M. Jones (born 1957), American cell biologist
Alan Hywel Jones (born 1970), British materials scientist

Others 
Alan Jones (architect) (born 1964), Ulster architect
Alan Jones (priest) (born 1940), former Dean of Grace Cathedral, San Francisco
Alan Wayne Jones (born 1945), researcher and writer on the subject of human physiology relating to alcohol consumption 
Alan W. Jones (1894–1969), U.S. Army general during World War II
Alan Jones (diplomat) (born 1953), former British High Commissioner to Sierra Leone and Belize
Alan Jones (film critic), film critic, broadcaster, and reporter

See also
Allan Jones (disambiguation)
Allen Jones (disambiguation)
Alun Jones (disambiguation)
Jones (surname)